The 1971 All-Ireland Senior Camogie Championship Final was the fortieth All-Ireland Final and the deciding match of the 1971 All-Ireland Senior Camogie Championship, an inter-county camogie tournament for the top teams in Ireland.

Cork won their second title in a row.

References

All-Ireland Senior Camogie Championship Final
All-Ireland Senior Camogie Championship Final
All-Ireland Senior Camogie Championship Final, 1971
All-Ireland Senior Camogie Championship Finals
Cork county camogie team matches
Wexford county camogie team matches